Blasted Mechanism or simply, Blasted is a Portuguese electro-rock band known for its highly theatrical live shows involving elaborated alien-themed costumes as a backdrop to their music.
The band was founded in 1995 by Karkov and Valdjiu. New members joined later to form the current line up. As they like to put it "they weren't created but invented", blasting into the Portuguese music scene with a very different sound and visuals. 
They quickly became known for their extravagant audiovisual performances involving alien and tribal looking musicians and an irreverent, upbeat attitude. Over the years, they developed a unique musical style that mixes alternative rock, electronic music, reggae, dub and folk.

Discography

Blasted Mechanism Demo (1994)

(unknown)

Blasted Mechanism EP (1996)
 Swinging with the Monkeys
 Calamidad
 The Atom Bride theme

Balayhashi (1998)
 Swinging with the Monkeys
 Calamidad
 The Atom Bride theme
 Polaroid
 Gators from Congo

SingleMix 00 
 Swinging with the Monkeys (00 Mix) by Ragmanan Saturnia
 Spasm (pink moon mix) by saturnia
 Danka Danka mix by toolateman

Plasma (1999)
 Oh Landou
 The Art of Fitting
 Zapping
 Mahdathai
 Connection
 Spasm
 18 Strings
 Karkow
 Blue Mood
 Nazka

SingleMix 01 
 Karkov (nadabrovichka mix) radio edit dj dimitrivzki
 The atom bride theme (remix) live
 Toolateman hymn radio edit by toolateman

Mix 00 (2000)
 Mahdathai (urban mix) by ragmanam
 Nazka (jap mix) by ragmanam ary
 Spasm (pink moon mix) by saturnia
 Blue Mood (lungs ahead) by ragmanam ary
 Karkov (nadabrovitchka mix) by dj dimitrivzki
 Swinging With The Monkeys (00 mix) by ragmanam saturnia
 Oh Landou (mesthai mix) by ragmanam ary
 Calamidub by toolateman
 The Atom Bride Theme (remix) by ragmanam saturnia
 Zapping (alex fx full mix) by alex fx for underdub

Namaste Promotional Single (2003)
 Are You Ready
 Walking On A Better Day
 Taman Taman (feat. J. B. Galissa)

Namaste (2003)
 Arrival to Borubudur
 Taman Taman (feat. J. B. Galissa)
 Are You Ready
 Walking On A Better Day
 I Believe
 Higher Than Paradise
 Bolivian Feel (feat. Virgul and J. B. Galissa)
 No Solution
 Maytsoba (auto chase between two dragon fly who lost wings)
 Rebel Tools
 No Black Nor Gray
 Write Your Soul
 Got To Move

DVD 1996-2004 (2004)

Format: Double DVD

DVD 1 (2003/2004)
Paredes de Coura Festival 2003
Extras
 Vilar de Mouros Festival 2003
 6 recorded themes on Christmas Eve in 2003
 Videoclips: “Are You Ready”; “I Believe”
 Summer festivals 2003 - Behind the scenes
 Slide-show
DVD 2 (1996/2002)
Sudoeste Festival 2002
Extras
 Videoclips: “Karkov” and “Swinging With The Monkeys”
 Sudoeste Festival 1997
 Behind the scenes in Sudoeste
 Lisbon Street Happening

Blasted Empire Promotional Single(2005)
 Blasted Empire (feat. Dj Nelassassin)

Avatara (2005)
 Blasted Empire (feat. Dj Nelassassin)
 Sun Goes Down
 What Is All About
 Manipulation
 Kurié Mahallande
 Power On (feat. Maria João)
 Enolough
 Sagar Mata
 Hand Full of Nothing (feat. Dealema)
 So Spaced Out
 Take That Shot
 Pink Hurricane (feat. Maria João)
 Memories Will Fade
 Space Hopper
 Stecotorketor

Tribos Unidas Promocional Single(2007)
 All The Way

Sound in Light / Light in Sound (2007)

Format: Double CD. When inserted the CD in the computer CD drive, you'll be taken by a blind link to a website where it is possible to download for free 10 extra tracks from a virtual record called "Light in Sound". The Digipack also has a slot to put an extra CD, made from the extra tracks downloaded.

CD 1 - Sound in Light
 Battle Of Tribes (feat. Kumpania Algazarra)
 Total Rebellion (BM vs Transglobal Underground)
 All the Way
 Sound in Light
 Sunshine (feat. Dani from “Macaco” and Rão Kyao)
 URU (Strange Faces) (feat. Kumpania Algazarra)
 Mystical Power
 You Never Leave Me Nothing
 We (ft. Antonio Chaínho)
 Suddenly
 N’dezdai Ddu Stae (feat. Nido D’Arac)
 Unarmed Rebellion (feat. Gaia Beat)
 Zimadê
 Sfi Nassan
 New Assault

CD 2 - Light in Sound
 Dimensional Nomads
 Reveal Your Art
 Vibe Master
 Rise To The Level
 Barbiturical Convulsion
 Learn Over
 The Perfect Shine
 Mahatma
 Saturn
 1000 Miles

Mind At Large (2009)
 Under The Sun
 Grab a Song (feat. Los Reyes)
 Start To Move (feat. Agostinho da Silva)
 Magic Dance
 Hello, Here Is The System
 Panacea
 Vôo de Icaro (feat. Marcelo D2)
 Hard To Breathe
 Blast Your Mind
 Door Of Happiness
 Source of Light
 Mind At Large
 Liberdade Destino (feat. Agostinho da Silva)

References

External links 

 Official site
 MySpace

Portuguese alternative rock groups
Golden Globes (Portugal) winners